St. Nicholas' Church is a parish of the Roman Catholic Church located in Luga near St. Petersburg in the Leningrad Oblast in northern Russia. It is a constituent of the Northwest Deanery of the Latin rite Archdiocese of Moscow, having been restored to its owners in 1996. The parish church, built in the Gothic Revival style, is a protected monument.

History
At the end of the nineteenth century almost five hundred Catholics were living in the town of Luga, mostly workers of the railway line. The parish registered and requested permission in 1895 to build a wooden chapel. The authorization was granted in 1902 by which time there were an increased the number of faithful, so they decided to build a small brick church. The Gothic design plans were entrusted to the architect Dietrich. It was dedicated on 29 June 1904 to Saint Nicholas. A few months later Fr. Antoni Malecki opened a parochial school for children from poor families.

Amidst the Stalinist repression, the church was closed in 1937; the priest, the organist and nineteen active parishioners were executed. The building was converted into a gym. After the fall of the USSR it was reconsecrated in 1996.

See also
Roman Catholicism in Russia
St. Nicholas' Church
Parish's Official Website (in Russian and English)

References

20th-century Roman Catholic church buildings in Russia
Roman Catholic churches completed in 1904
Christian organizations established in 1902
Gothic Revival church buildings in Russia
Buildings and structures in Leningrad Oblast
Cultural heritage monuments of regional significance in Leningrad Oblast